The Baptist Convention of Malawi is a Baptist Christian denomination in Malawi. It is affiliated with the Baptist World Alliance. The headquarters is in Lilongwe.

History
The Baptist Convention of Malawi has its origins in an American mission of the Southern Baptist Convention in 1959.  It is officially founded in 1970.  According to a denomination census released in 2020, it claimed 2,000 churches and 300,000 members.

References

Baptist denominations in Africa
Evangelicalism in Malawi